Les Echos is a daily French-language online newspaper published in Bamako, Mali.

References

External links 
 

Newspapers published in Mali
French-language newspapers published in Africa
Publications with year of establishment missing